This is a list of contestants who have appeared on The Amazing Race Norge, a Norwegian reality game show based on the American series, The Amazing Race. Contestants with a pre-existing relationship form a team and race across around the world against other teams to claim a prize valued at a worth of NOK 1 million. In total, 42 contestants have appeared in the series.

Contestants

See also
 List of The Amazing Race Norge winners

References

Amazing Race Norge contestants, The